Barbara Brecht-Schall (28 October 1930 – 31 August 2015) was a German actress. 

Born Barbara Marie Brecht in Berlin to Bertolt Brecht and Helene Weigel, she had three siblings, a full brother Stefan, a half-brother Frank Banholzer and a half-sister Hanne Hiob.  

Starting in 1933, her family moved around Europe to avoid the Nazi regime. They eventually arrived in Los Angeles, but left America in 1947 shortly after Bertolt Brecht testified in front of the House Committee on Un-American Activities. Her father established the Berliner Ensemble in 1949, a theatre company in which she also acted. Brecht later married Ekkehard Schall, with whom she had two daughters, Johanna Schall and Jenny Schall-Dizdari.

Barbara Brecht-Schall died in Berlin on 31 August 2015, aged 84.

Selected filmography
Ein Polterabend (1955)
Berlin, Schoenhauser Corner (1957)
Castles and Cottages (1957)
Katzgraben (1957)
 Lotte In Weimar (1975)

References

External links

1930 births
2015 deaths
Actresses from Berlin
20th-century German actresses
German film actresses
Jewish German actresses
Family of Bertolt Brecht